Beach sepak takraw competition at the 2016 Asian Beach Games was held in Danang, Vietnam from 25 September to 2 October 2016 at My Khe Beach, Danang, Vietnam.

Medalists

Medal table

Results

Men's trios

Preliminary

Group A

Group B

Knockout round

Men's regu

Preliminary

Group A

Group B

Knockout round
29 September

Men's team regu

Women's trios

Preliminary

Group A

Group B

Knockout round

Women's regu

Women's team regu

References

External links 
 

2016 Asian Beach Games events
2016